Motherland Hotel is a 1987 Turkish film directed by Ömer Kavur. It is an adaptation of the novel of the same name by Yusuf Atılgan.

Plot
Zebercet owns a hotel in a small provincial town. He manages to keep it up with the help of one maid, a little girl who lives with him. One evening, one of the clients leaves the hotel, promising to return in a week. Haunted by the memory of the beautiful unknown, it leaves little to be gained by a little melancholy. Overwhelmed by his impulses, he refuses to take any clients, and closes the hotel.

Cast
Macit Koper - Zebercet
Şahika Tekand - The lady
Serra Yılmaz - Ortalıkçı
Orhan Çağman - Emekli Subay

Awards
1987 Antalya Golden Orange Film Festival: Best  Director, Second Best Film
1987 Istanbul Film Festival: Best Turkish Film
1987 Venice Film Festival: FIPRESCI (International Film Critics Federation) Award

External links
 

1986 films
Turkish crime thriller films
1980s Turkish-language films
1980s crime thriller films
Films directed by Ömer Kavur
Films set in Turkey
Films scored by Attila Özdemiroğlu
Cockfighting in film